Lars H.U.G. (born Lars Haagensen on 11 September 1953 in Sorgenfri) is a Danish musician and painter. He has produced several critically acclaimed albums as a solo artist, and has performed with the group Kliché. 

Until the mid 1980s, he went by the name Lars Hug. Hug was the artist's childhood nickname and he also used it as a stage name. In 1987 he was sued by the pipe manufacturer Poul Erwin Hug, which forbid him from performing under their name. In response, he changed his name to Lars Hugh Uno Grammy, which he abbreviated as Lars H.U.G.

Musical career 
Lars H.U.G. began his career performing with the group Kliché, which formed in 1977, and released two albums. The group officially broke up in 1985. H.U.G. released his first album as a solo artist, City Slang, in 1984 while Kliché was on a break. The album was in collaboration Søren Ulrik Thomsen, and put music to the poet's anthology of the same title.

In 1993, he became the first rock musician to receive a work grant from the Danish Arts Foundation. He was nominated by the foundation for a lifetime performance award in 2003.

His last album, 10 Sekunders Stilhed, was released in 2014 and received gold certification. H.U.G announced his retirement as a musician at the Crown Prince Couple's Awards in 2016.

Painting 
At the age of 18, H.U.G enrolled at the Jutland Art Academy in Aarhus. He studied there from 1975 until 1978 as a painter. Several of his album covers feature his own art.

H.U.G. worked alongside Michael Kvium in Mojacar, Spain in 1988. He held his first major exhibition in 2001 at Gjethuset in Frederiksværk. He has since worked and been exhibited in Brooklyn, Berlin, Washington D.C., and Koroni. In 2009, he was invited to an exhibit in Washington DC by the Danish ambassador. He also held a guest lecture at the Corcoran School of the Arts while in DC. In 2010, he was invited to exhibit his works at the Danish Consulate in New York and to attend the Scandinavia House's Cultural Frontrunner Conference.

Discography 

For releases with the band Kliché, see Kliché.

Albums 

 City Slang (with Søren Ulrik Thomsen) (Medley, 1984)
 Kysser himlen farvel (Medley, 1987)
 Kopy (Medley) 1989
 Blidt over dig (Medley, 1992)
 Kiss & Hug From a Happy Boy (featuring Once Around the Park) (Medley, 1996)
 Save Me from This Rock 'n' Roll (Medley, 2003)
 10 sekunders stilhed (Genlyd, 2014)

EPs 

 Replugged Live (Genlyd, 2015)

Compilation albums 

 G.R.E.A.T.E.S.T. (Medley, 1993)
 Greatest H.U.G. (EMI, 2004)
 De første fra Lars H.U.G. (EMI, 2012)

Awards and nominations

References 

1953 births
Living people
Danish rock singers
Danish painters
People from Lyngby-Taarbæk Municipality